is the fifth single by Japanese recording artist Arisa Mizuki. It was released on May 12, 1993 as the first single from Mizuki's first compilation album Fiore: Arisa Collection. The title track was written and composed by Yumi Matsutoya, under the pen-name Karuho Kureta. It was used in commercials for the soft drink Chasse by Kirin, starring Mizuki herself. "Sunao ni Naritai," is Mizuki's second consecutive B-side to be written and produced by singer-songwriter Midori Karashima.

Chart performance 
"Kotoshi Ichiban Kaze no Tsuyoi Gogo" debuted on the Oricon Weekly Singles chart at number 8 with 74,400 copies sold in its first week. The single charted for seven weeks and has sold a total of 192,950 copies.

Track listing

Charts and sales

References 

1993 singles
Alisa Mizuki songs
1993 songs
Songs written by Yumi Matsutoya